The 1938 Argentine Primera División was the 47th season of top-flight football in Argentina. The season began on April 3 and ended on December 18.

There were 17 teams in the tournament, and Independiente won the championship.

League standings

References

Argentine Primera Division
Primera Division
Argentine Primera División seasons